Flower’s Barrow is an Iron Age hillfort, built over 2500 years ago, above Worbarrow Bay in Dorset on the south coast of England.

Location 

Towering to the north over Worbarrow Bay is Flower’s Barrow ridge. This forms the western end of the ridge which runs all the way to Ballard Point north of Swanage. The ancient hillfort of Flower's Barrow rises behind the beach at Arish Mell. The hill lies directly west of the ghost village of Tyneham. Flower’s Barrow has a limited future because the southern part is falling into the sea at Worbarrow Bay due to coastal erosion. Probably more than half of it has already disappeared.

Access to Flower’s Barrow hillfort is solely possible by foot, either from Tyneham, with a steep uphill walk, or alternatively from the viewing point and car park at Whiteway Hill walking along the hill to the west. Flower’s Barrow is only accessible when the Lulworth Ranges are open to the public. The ranges are owned by the Ministry of Defence and are part of the Armoured Fighting Vehicles Gunnery School. The more than  ranges lie within an Area of Outstanding Natural Beauty and stretches along the coastline between Lulworth Cove to just west of Kimmeridge. Safety warnings about explosives and unexploded shells are posted around the site by the MoD, and visitors are advised to keep to official footpaths and abide to local site notices, because tanks and armoured vehicles are used in this area.

Hillfort 
This early Iron Age hillfort, taken over by the Romans when they invaded, has double and triple ramparts. The parallel double ramparts on the east and west flanks are connected along the northern border and are unmistakably visible. Because the cliff face acted as defence, it is probable that there were never ramparts along the southern end.

Several sections of the interior of the hillfort have been exposed following coastal erosion. Hut circles are visible within the interior of the fort. During a minor excavation in 1939 fragments of Iron Age pottery, as well as sling-stones and bones were found in a pit near the western entrance. Subsequent landslides have revealed the floor of the hillfort. The continual ground disturbances at the southern fringe increase the possibility of further archaeological finds. However, the twin hazards of the cliff erosion and the possibility of unexploded military shells from the Lulworth Ranges command extreme caution. Visitors are warned to keep to the footpaths and between the yellow MoD markers.

Geology 

The steep angular layers of rock, that are clearly visible in the bay, reveal the complex sedimentary folding that disturbed the geology in this vicinity. These folds were caused by tectonic pressures some 30 million years ago as the African and European continents collided. At this time the cliff sediments were twisted horizontally and this is why the Chalks that are between 85 and 145 million years old are found at the rear of the bay. The sediments that form Mupe Ledges, the Mupe Rocks and the peninsula Worbarrow Tout are 150-million-year-old Portland Limestone and 147-million-year-old Purbeck Beds.

References

Bibliography

Isle of Purbeck
Jurassic Coast
Geography of Dorset
Hill forts in Dorset